Crangon septemspinosa is a species of shrimp, one of several known as the sand shrimp.

References

Crustaceans of the Atlantic Ocean
Crustaceans described in 1818
Taxa named by Thomas Say
Crangonidae